The Memphis Hustle are an American professional basketball team of the NBA G League based in the Greater Memphis suburb of Southaven, Mississippi, and are affiliated with the Memphis Grizzlies. The team plays their home games at the Landers Center.

History
On January 23, 2017, it was announced that the Iowa Energy would not renew their hybrid affiliation deal with the Grizzlies, but be purchased by the Minnesota Timberwolves to serve as their G-League affiliate beginning in the 2017–18 season.  That same day, the Grizzlies announced that they would be purchasing an expansion team "for the Mid-South" to begin play in 2017–18 in Southaven, Mississippi, about sixteen miles from Downtown Memphis and the FedExForum, across the Tennessee-Mississippi border. On May 30, 2017, it was announced that Glynn Cyprien would be the head coach and Chris Makris the general manager of the team.  On June 1, 2017 the Memphis Grizzlies unveiled their new NBA Development League affiliate team name and logo as the Memphis Hustle.

Season by season

Current roster

Coaches

NBA affiliates
Memphis Grizzlies (2017–present)

References

External links
Memphis Hustle official site

 
2017 establishments in Mississippi
Basketball teams established in 2017
Basketball teams in Mississippi
Memphis Grizzlies
Sports in Southaven, Mississippi